Sigard (Sigehard), was a tenth-century Lotharingian count in Hainaut and Liugas, between Liège and Aachen. Various relationships to others have been proposed for him, but these are all uncertain.

Leon Vanderkindere proposed that this Sigehard was given the county of Hainaut while Reginar I was out of favour, however it is impossible to prove that Reginar ever held it.
902. The county of "Sigarhard" included Wandre and Esneux in the pagus of Liugas (in pago Leuchia in comitatu Sigarhardi).
In 905 Rouvreux, Foccroule, Noidré and Lillé (Rouoreiz, Felderolas, Nordereit, Leleias) are described as being in pago et comitatu Liuuensi, indicating they were also in a county of the same name as the pagus, but not naming the count.
908. He was recorded once as a count who was present agreements made about both Lobbes Abbey (Laubacensum abbatiam), which was described as part of the county and pagus of Hainaut (in pago ac in comitatu Hainuensi sitem), and Theux, which was described as being in the pagus and county of Liugas (in pago ac in comitatu Liwensi positum).
915. Theux is described as being both in the pagus of Liugas and the county of Sigehard (in pago Leuviensi atque in comitatus Sichardi sitam).
920. He was also recorded as a "venerable" count in a document concerning Crespin Abbey in Hainaut, concerning a grant. According to Nonn, the record shows that he had held the land involved.

References

Sources 
 Nonn, Ulrich (1983) Pagus und Comitatus

Further reading
 Jackman, Donald C. (2010) Ius hereditarium Encountered I: The Meingaud-Walaho Inheritance.

External links
 Medieval Lands Project, Comtes de Hainaut 998-1051, Reginar Family

European nobility
10th-century European people
Nobility of the Carolingian Empire
Counts of Hainaut
920 deaths
Year of birth unknown
Year of death uncertain